, also written , is Latin for "scattered fragments" (also scattered limbs, members, or remains) and is used to refer to surviving fragments of ancient poetry, manuscripts, and other literary or cultural objects, including even fragments of ancient pottery.

Ancient and medieval poetry, literature, and manuscripts

Fragments of ancient writing, especially ancient Latin poetry found in other works, are commonly referred to as disjecta membra.

Although Horace's intended meaning remains the subject of speculation and debate, the passage is often taken to imply that if a line from poetry were torn apart and rearranged, the dismembered parts of the poet would still be recognisable. In this sense, in the study of literature, disjecta membra is often used to describe the piecing together of ancient fragments of an identifiable literary source. Similarly, isolated leaves or parts of leaves from ancient or medieval manuscripts may also be termed disjecta membra.  Scholars have been able to identify fragments now held in different libraries that originally belonged to the same manuscript.

Pottery

They have studied fragments of ancient Greek pottery in institutional collections, and have attributed many such pieces to the artists who made them. In a number of instances, they have been able to identify fragments now in different collections that belong to the same vase.

See also

Fragmentology (manuscripts).

References

Latin words and phrases
History of poetry
Archaeological terminology
Medieval manuscripts